Charlie Power may refer to:

Charlie Power (politician) (born 1948), Canadian politician
Charlie Power (Canadian football) (born 1991), Canadian football running back

See also
 Charles Power (disambiguation)